George A. Obiozor CON (15 August 1942 – 26 December 2022) was a Nigerian professor and diplomat who was the Nigerian Ambassador to the United States.

Early life and education
Obiozor was born on 15 August 1942. He studied at the Institute of African Studies, and Albert Schweitzer College. He graduated from the University of Puget Sound in 1969, and from Columbia University with a Ph.D. in International Affairs.

Career
Obiozor was director-general of the Nigerian Institute of International Affairs. He later became the High Commissioner to Cyprus, before becoming ambassador to Israel, from 1999 to 2003, then ambassador to the United States, from 2004 to 2008.

Obiozor was elected as the President General of Ohaneze ndi Igbo on 9 January 2021, a socio-cultural group was formed to cater for the welfare of the Igbo nation from Nigeria.

Works
Uneasy Friendships: Nigeria-United States Relations, Fourth Dimension Pub. Co., 1992, 
The politics of precarious balancing: an analysis of contending issues in Nigerian domestic and foreign policy, Nigerian Institute of International Affairs, 1994, 
Nigeria and the World: Managing the Politics of Diplomatic Ambivalence in a Changing World. Panatlantic Books, Centre for Human Security.

Quotes
 "Politics is a concentric series of conspiracies in which the last party to conspire emerges victorious"

Personal life and death 
George Obiozor died on 26 December 2022, at the age of 80. He was survived by his 3 Children

References

External links
"Interview with a Nigerian Statesman – Ambassador George Obiozor", ''
Nigerian Embassy to the US - Ambassadors Biography 2008

1942 births
2022 deaths
School of International and Public Affairs, Columbia University alumni
Igbo politicians
Ambassadors of Nigeria to the United States
High Commissioners of Nigeria to Cyprus
Ambassadors of Nigeria to Israel
Commanders of the Order of the Niger
University of Puget Sound alumni